Eugenio César Laborinho (born January 10, 1955) is an Angolan Lieutenant General and politician of the People's Movement for the Liberation of Angola (MPLA); Governor of Cabinda Province; Minister of Interior of Angola since 2019.

Early life and education 
Eugénio César Laborinho, was born on January 10, 1955, in the province of Malanje, to Armando César Laborinho and Natália Ferreira de Andrade. Eugénio César Laborinho has a degree in Psychology since 1997, from the Institute of Education Sciences (ISCED), at the University, Dr. Antonio Agostinho Neto.

Professional career 
Eugénio César Laborinho joined the Military Security Service of the People's Movement for the Liberation of Angola in Malanje during the Angolan War of Independence in 1975.

In 1976, he became the head of the intelligence service of the People's Armed Forces of Liberation of Angola, the armed part of the MPLA, in Malanje and in 1977 he became the Deputy Chief of Cabinet for Organization, Planning and Control of State Security (Segurança de Estado) .

In 1978, he became the officer in charge and head of security for Diamang, a company that existed until 1986 and dealt with diamond mining in Angola. In 1981, he took over the post of Military Chief of the Angolan Armed Forces in Cunene Province and in 1982 as Military Chief and Chief of Security in the Central Operative Command (Comando Central Operativo) of the Province of Bié.

In 1983, Laborinho was elected a member of the People's Assembly (Assembleia Popular Provincial) of Bié Province for the MPLA and in 1984 attended the leadership course in Portugal.

In 1986, he became commander of the fire brigade and civil protection (Comandante dos Bombeiros e Protecção Civil) and held this position until 2010. During this time he attended a course for firefighters in Portugal in 1990, for fire maneuvers and combined units in 1994 and for supervisors in 1995 and executives at the School of the Ministry of Internal Administration (Escola do Ministério da Administração Interna).

He also completed a degree in psychology at the Higher Institute of Education (Instituto Superior de Ciências da Educação) of the Universidade Agostinho Neto (UAN) and graduated with a license (Licenciatura em Psicologia). He then became a member of the Psychological Society (Associação dos Psicólogos de Angola).

In 2010, became Deputy Interior Minister for Civil Defense and Fire Services and acted as such until 2017 as Executive Coordinator of the National Commission for Civil Protection.

In 2017–2019, Laborinho served as Governor of Cabinda Province.

On July 24, 2019, President João Lourenço appointed him to succeed Ângelo de Barros Veiga Tavares as Minister of the Interior in his cabinet. At the VIII Congress, the Central Committee of the MPLA elected a Politburo consisting of 101 people, to which he also belongs.

Political career 
Eugénio César Laborinho has been the MPLA (People's Movement for the Liberation of Angola) activist.

1974 – Participation in MPLA (People's Movement for the Liberation of Angola)  clandestine actions.

1982 – Elected member of the CPP and of the Executive Committee of the MPLA-PT.

1983 – Elected Deputy of the Provincial People's Assembly of Bié.

1983 to 1985 – Member of the Provincial Party Committee in Bié.

2016 – Elected Member of the MPLA Central Committee - Luanda.

2017 – Elected as the first Provincial Secretary of the MPLA in Cabinda.

2018 – Member of the Political Bureau of the Central Committee.

Military ranks 
1976 – Promotion to the rank of 1st Lieutenant.

1980 – Promotion to the rank of Captain.

1986 – Patenting to the military rank of Major.

1988 – Promotion to the military rank of Colonel.

2001 – Promotion to the rank of Lieutenant General (Order #13/01 do Comandante em Chefe/FAA, de 29 de Setembro)

Awards 
2009 – Awarding of a Diploma of Merit for the services provided at the Ministry of Interior, during 30 years of service.

2009 – a Diploma of Merit for the excellent services provided within the scope of the Union of Firefighters of Portuguese-Speaking Countries (Brazil)

2009 – Medal awarded for the 50th anniversary of the founding of the MPLA.

2010 – Medal awarded for services provided within the scope of the Portuguese Fire Brigade.

2010 – Medal awarded for services rendered to communities by the National Civil Protection Authority.

References

External links 
 República de Angola: Ministros

Government of Angola
Interior ministers of Angola
Angolan military personnel
Living people
1955 births